Chief of Navy (CN) commands the Royal New Zealand Navy (RNZN) and is responsible to the Chief of Defence Force (CDF) for raising, training and sustaining those forces necessary to meet agreed government outputs. The CN acts as principal advisor to the CDF on Navy matters, and is the most senior appointment in the RNZN. The rank associated with the position is rear admiral, and CNs are generally appointed on a three-year term.

The position was originally created as Chief of Naval Staff and First Naval Member upon the formation of the RNZN on 1 October 1941. A number of the officers who became CNS served as Commodore, Auckland (later named Maritime Component Commander) before taking the helm of the Navy. The title changed to Chief of Naval Staff in 1970, and CN in 2003. Rear Admiral David Proctor, the incumbent CN, assumed the post on 29 November 2018.

Appointees
The following list chronologically records those who have held the post of Chief of Navy or its preceding positions, with rank and honours as at the completion of the individual's term.

|-
| colspan="6" align="center" bgcolor="white" | Chief of Naval Staff and First Naval Member

|-
| colspan="6" align="center" bgcolor="white" | Chief of Naval Staff

|-
| colspan="6" align="center" bgcolor="white" | Chief of Navy

Notes

References

New Zealand
Royal New Zealand Navy